Joe Pelton (born July 20, 1977 in Waterloo, Iowa) is an American business analyst and poker tournament player, who is based in Newport Beach, California.  He attended Harvey Mudd College and graduated in 1999.  While studying at Harvey Mudd, his nickname was the "Moral Pillar".

Pelton is active in financial markets and frequently writes about his trades.

Poker 
As of 2020, his total live tournament winnings exceeded $2,323,000.

World Poker Tour 

Pelton is the winner of the 2006 WPT Legends of Poker Main Event, beating out notable professional players such as Hoyt Corkins and Scotty Nguyen. Later that same year, he placed third at the WPT Festa Al Lago Main Event. Before his win at the Legends of Poker (and the $1,500,000 first place prize), Pelton's largest tournament prize was $11,135.

References

External links 
 Interview of Pelton
 Player summary from PokerListings

American poker players
World Poker Tour winners
Living people
1977 births
Harvey Mudd College alumni
People from Waterloo, Iowa